Ellis Davies may refer to:
 Ellis Davies (politician), Welsh politician and lawyer
 Ellis Davies (priest), Welsh priest and antiquarian
 Ellis Thomas Davies, Welsh Independent minister
 Reg Davies (footballer, born 1929) (Ellis Reginald Davies), Welsh footballer